Andorno Station near Winnemucca, Nevada is a historic stagecoach station and hotel site that dates from 1899. It includes Late Victorian architecture. It was listed on the National Register of Historic Places in 1995.

The main house and five other contributing buildings (a wagon shed, a barn, a jail, a workshop, and a bunkhouse) were all built during 1899–1900.  Newer buildings (a garage, a shop, and a walk-in freezer) are not contributing but do not detract greatly from the historic feeling of the property.

References

Buildings and structures in Humboldt County, Nevada
Defunct hotels in Nevada
Hotel buildings completed in 1899
Transport infrastructure completed in 1899
Commercial buildings on the National Register of Historic Places in Nevada
National Register of Historic Places in Humboldt County, Nevada
1899 establishments in Nevada
Victorian architecture in Nevada
Stagecoach stations on the National Register of Historic Places in Nevada